Cornelius Joseph "Neil" Cohalan (July 31, 1906 – January 22, 1968) was an American basketball coach.  He was the first coach of the New York Knicks and has the distinction of being the winning coach of the first game played in the Basketball Association of America (BAA), the forerunner to the modern National Basketball Association (NBA).  The game, a November 1, 1946 contest between the Knicks and the Toronto Huskies played in famed Maple Leaf Gardens, was won 68–66 by the Knickerbockers.

Prior to his pro career, Cohalan was the head basketball coach at Manhattan College from 1924 through 1942, where as a student he played basketball and football.

Cohalan died on January 22, 1968.

References

External links
 NBA.com.  The first game
 BasketballReference.com: Neil Cohalan
 

1906 births
1968 deaths
American football quarterbacks
American men's basketball players
New York Knicks head coaches
Manhattan Jaspers football players
Manhattan Jaspers basketball coaches
Manhattan Jaspers basketball players
Sportspeople from the Bronx
Players of American football from New York (state)
Basketball coaches from New York (state)
Basketball players from New York City